The 2013 Rice Owls football team represented Rice University in the 2013 NCAA Division I FBS football season. The team was led by seventh-year head coach David Bailiff and played its home games at Rice Stadium. The team was a member of the West Division of Conference USA (C-USA). They finished the season 10–4 overall, 7–1 in C-USA play, which was good for first place in the West Division. They won the C-USA championship by beating Marshall, the first-place team in the East Division, 41–24 in the C-USA conference championship game. They were invited to the AutoZone Liberty Bowl, where they lost to Mississippi State, 44–7.

Schedule

Schedule Source:

Game summaries

Texas A&M

Rankings

References

Rice
Rice Owls football seasons
Conference USA football champion seasons
Rice Owls football